Amanda Marie Musgrave (born September 19, 1986) is an American actress and singer. Best known for her portrayal of Ashley Davies on the television series South of Nowhere, as well as portraying Misty Monroe in the web series Girltrash! and the film Girltrash: All Night Long, 
she has also appeared on a number of shows as a guest star.

Early life
Musgrave was born in Orlando, Florida, and began acting at the age of 6. She became interested in acting while in high school. She performed roles in Anything Goes and The Miracle Worker.

Career
Within a year of arriving in Los Angeles, California, she appeared on the television show CSI: Crime Scene Investigation. Her big break came when she landed the role of Chelsea Benson on the daytime drama Days of Our Lives, appearing on the series from 2004 to 2005. In addition, Musgrave appeared on The King of Queens in 2005. Later that year, she debuted on South of Nowhere as Ashley Davies.

In 2007, Musgrave appeared opposite of her South of Nowhere love interest Gabrielle Christian in web series Girltrash!. Musgrave portrayed actress Misty Monroe; Christian played college graduate Colby Robson. In 2014, Musgrave and Christian reprised their roles in a new musical film called Girltrash: All Night Long by Angela Robinson.

Musgrave also starred in Dan's Detour of Life, a webseries comedy written by the producers of That '70s Show. She portrayed Jessie Ford, a 15-year-old high school student dealing with her parents' abrupt divorce. In 2010, Musgrave was cast in a guest role on the television series 90210. She appeared in three episodes as Alexa, Gia's ex-girlfriend. In 2019, Musgrave was cast as Carol Lockhart on General Hospital.

In 2019, Musgrave starred as the lead role in the indie short film Mama Bear, written by Lee Ehlers and directed by her partner, Matt Cohen. The film follows an suburban mother who must unexpectedly secure a liver transplant for her dying son, who has only 24 hours to live. The film first was premiered at the HollyShorts Film Festival on August 13, 2019, and then was released to the public on September 1, 2019.

Personal life
Musgrave has two sisters. Musgrave spends time with South of Nowhere co-stars Gabrielle Christian, Maeve Quinlan, and Matt Cohen. Musgrave married Cohen in May 2011. They gave birth to the couple's son in April 2015. Musgrave frequently runs, enjoys karaoke, writes her own poetry, and paints collages.

Filmography

Film

Television

Web

Awards and nominations

References

External links
 
 

1986 births
American soap opera actresses
American television actresses
American film actresses
Living people
Actresses from Orlando, Florida
21st-century American women